Bicyclus hewitsonii, the large blue-banded bush brown, is a butterfly in the family Nymphalidae. It is endemic to Nigeria, Cameroon, Bioko, Gabon, the Republic of the Congo, the Central African Republic and the Democratic Republic of the Congo. The habitat consists of dense primary forests.

Adults are often found feeding from fallen fruit.

References

Seitz, A. Die Gross-Schmetterlinge der Erde 13: Die Afrikanischen Tagfalter. Plate XIII 26

Elymniini
Butterflies described in 1861
Butterflies of Africa